Peckforton is a civil parish in Cheshire East, England. It contains 21 buildings that are recorded in the National Heritage List for England as designated listed buildings.  Of these, one is listed at Grade I, the highest grade, four are listed at Grade II*, the middle grade, and the others are at Grade II.  The most important structure in the parish is Peckforton Castle, a Victorian country house built for John Tollemache in the form of a Norman castle.  This, its chapel, and its entrance lodge are listed, as are a farm and cottages on the former Tollemache estate.  The other listed buildings are all houses or cottages, and a large carving of an elephant and castle.

Key

Buildings

See also

Listed buildings in Spurstow
Listed buildings in Ridley
Listed buildings in Bulkeley
Listed buildings in Burwardsley
Listed buildings in Beeston

References
Citations

Sources

Listed buildings in the Borough of Cheshire East
Lists of listed buildings in Cheshire